Herbert Hirth (born 23 January 1884, date of death unknown) was a German international footballer.

References

1884 births
Year of death missing
Association football defenders
German footballers
Germany international footballers
Hertha BSC players